James Carman (born 1876) was an English footballer. His regular position was as a forward. He was born in Salford, Lancashire. He played for Manchester United and Oldham County.

External links
MUFCInfo.com profile

1876 births
English footballers
Manchester United F.C. players
Year of death missing
Association football forwards